Bünyamin is an older pronunciation and Turkish variant of Benjamin and may refer to:

 Bünyamin Sezer, Turkish weightlifter
 Bünyamin Sudaş, Turkish weightlifter
 Mohd Bunyamin Umar, Malaysian footballer
 Bünyamin Çankırlı, Songwriter

Turkish masculine given names